Kinonchulus is a genus of nematode, one of the few to retain its pharyngeal armature to adulthood.

References

Enoplea genera